The Hyderabad Deccan Cigarette Factory was established in 1930 at Musheerabad a suburb of Hyderabad by Janab Mohammad Abdus Sattar. The factory also known as Golconda Factory  owns Golconda brand of cigarette. The road junction Golconda X Roads is named after then popular brand manufactured by this company. The factory which used to manufacture the popular Golconda brand and Amar brand of cigarettes, is now a contract manufacturer of cigarettes for ITC Limited.

Mr. Sattar's son-in-law, Shah Alam Khan had been running the factory since 1946.

The factory in its present form as a privately held company was incorporated in September 1972.

References

Hyderabad State
Manufacturing companies based in Hyderabad, India
Tobacco companies of India
Indian companies established in 1930
Indian companies established in 1972